Kogan is a Russian version of the Jewish surname Cohen, which denotes the descendants of the high priests of ancient Israel.

Kogan may also refer to:

 Kogan.com, an Australian portfolio of retail and services businesses
 Kogan, Queensland, a town in Australia

See also

Kohen (disambiguation)
Cohen (disambiguation)